Pedro Laín Entralgo (15 February 1908 – 5 June 2001) was a Spanish physician, historian, author and philosopher.  He worked, fundamentally, on medical history and anthropology.

Biography 
He was born in Urrea de Gaén (Teruel, Spain) in 1908. He obtained the degrees of Medicine and Chemical Sciences in the Central University of Madrid, and PhD in Medicine with the dissertation: "El problema de las relaciones entre la medicina y la historia" (The problem of the relationships between medicine and history".

In the context of the Spanish Civil postwar period, he became an important member of the intellectual circle of the Falange. In 1942 he obtained the first chair of History of Medicine in the country, at the Central University of Madrid. In 1951, during the period of Joaquín Ruiz-Jiménez as Ministry of education, he became rector of the institution, creating a circle of certain political openness.

He was a member of the Royal Spanish Academy, the Royal National Academy of Medicine and of the Royal Academy of History. He obtained the Prince of Asturias award for Communication and Humanities in 1989 and was awarded with the Menéndez Pelayo International Prize in 1991.

Philosophical work 
His work is very varied and extensive. Regarding his historical-medical work, his works on medicine in classical Greece, his history and theory of clinical history and his works on Santiago Ramón y Cajal stand out. In addition, he coordinated a monumental Historia Universal de la Medicina (1972–1975) (Universal History of Medicine), in which not only all the Spanish specialists participated, but also renowned foreign historians of medicine.

He published several books on philosophical anthropology in which he analyzed the profound nature of the human being and the current history and theory of the problem of body and soul.

Disciples 
He was able to attract a good number of physicians around him who began to professionalize the History of Medicine (and, later, of science) in Spain. They stand out, among them, Luis S. Granjel (1920–2014), professor at the University of Salamanca, José María López Piñero (1933–2010) in Valencia, Juan Antonio Paniagua Arellano (1920–2010) in Navarra and Agustín Albarracín Teulón (1922–2001) and Diego Gracia Guillén (born in 1941), at the Complutense University of Madrid.

Books 
 Reconciliar España. Editorial Triacastela. 2010. .
 Escritos sobre Cajal. Editorial Triacastela. 2010. .
 España como problema. Galaxia Gutenberg; Círculo de Lectores. 2006. .
 El médico y el enfermo. Editorial Triacastela. 2003. .
 Qué es el hombre: evolución y sentido de la vida. Círculo de Lectores. 1999. . (Premio Internacional de Ensayo Jovellanos).
 Historia universal de la medicina. Masson. 1998. .
 El problema de ser cristiano. Círculo de Lectores. 1998. .
 Idea del hombre. Círculo de Lectores. 1997. .
 Alma, cuerpo, persona. Galaxia Gutenberg. 1997. .
 La Generación del 98. Espasa-Colección Austral. 1997 (2ª edición). .
 Ser y conducta del hombre. Espasa-Calpe. 1996. .
 Cuerpo y alma. Estructura dinámica del cuerpo humano. Espasa-Calpe. 1996. .
 Creer, esperar, amar. Galaxia Gutenberg; Círculo de Lectores. 1993. .
 El cuerpo humano. Teoría actual. Espasa-Universidad. 1989. .
 Teoría y realidad del otro. Alianza. 1988. .
 La medicina actual. Seminarios y ediciones s.a. 1973.
 Sobre la amistad. Espasa-Calpe. 1972.
 La espera y la esperanza. Historia y teoría del esperar humano. Revista de Occidente. 1957.
 Historia de la Medicina (Medicina moderna y contemporánea). Científico Médica. 1954.
 Los valores morales del Nacionalsindicalismo. Editora Nacional. 1941.

References
 Andrés-Gallego, José (1997). ¿Fascismo o Estado católico?: Ideología, religión y censura en la España de Franco, 1937–1941. Madrid: Encuentro.
 Bowen, Wayne H. (2009). «Spanish Pilgrimages to Hitler's Germany: Emissaries of the New Order». The Historian 71 (2): 258–279. . .
 Balaguer Perigüell, Emili (2002). «Don Pedro Laín Entralgo, in memoriam». Dynamis. Acta Hispanica ad Medicinae Scientiarumque Historiam Illustrandam (22): 509–514. .
 Gracia Guillén, Diego (2010). Voluntad de comprensión: la aventura intelectual de Pedro Laín Entralgo. Triacastela (Madrid) / Instituto de Estudios Turolenses (Teruel). .
 López Piñero, José María (2005). Pedro Laín Entralgo y la Historiografía Médica. Real Academia de la Historia. .
 Morente Valero, Francisco (2011). «Más allá del páramo. La historia de los intelectuales durante el franquismo». En: Carmen Frías, José Luis Ledesma y Javier Rodrigo (Eds.). Reevaluaciones. Historias locales y miradas globales. Actas del VII Congreso de Historia Local de Aragón (Zaragoza: Institución Fernando el Católico): 41–76. .
 Pasamar Alzuria, Gonzalo; Peiró Martín, Ignacio (2002). Diccionario Akal de Historiadores españoles contemporáneos. Tres Cantos: Ediciones AKAL. p. 348. .
 Pedrós, Ramón (18 de julio de 1976). «Laín Entralgo: "descargo de conciencia"». ABC (Madrid): 30.
 Redondo, Gonzalo (1993). Historia de la Iglesia en España, 1931–1939: La Guerra Civil, 1936–1939. Ediciones Rialp. .
 Redondo Martínez, César (2004). Origen, constitución y destino del hombre según Pedro Laín Entralgo. I.T. San Ildefonso. .
 Rodríguez Puértolas, Julio (2008). Historia de la literatura fascista española I. Akal.

External links
 Pedro Lain Entralgo in Prince of Asturias website
 Pedro Lain Entralgo 

Members of the Royal Spanish Academy
Spanish people of the Spanish Civil War (National faction)
Spanish Falangists
1908 births
2001 deaths
Medical historians